Float is the fourth studio album by the Celtic punk band Flogging Molly. It was released on March 4, 2008, and debuted at number four on the Billboard 200 albums chart, selling about 48,000 copies in its first week. It also reached number one on the Billboard Independent chart and number two on the Billboard Alternative chart.

The album features a darker and more political subject matter, with less whimsical and punk-influenced music.

Critical reception 

Float received generally positive reviews from critics. While Decoymusic noted that the edge from Flogging Molly's previous albums Swagger and Drunken Lullabies "isn't there any more", they praised the band for their consistency and for "sharpening their well established sound". In another positive review, AllMusic wrote that Float is "full of the boozy, bleary-eyed, fatalistic poetry that makes Irish music at once romantic and grimly realistic". They also noted the album's political themes regarding the treatment of Iraq war veterans ("From the Back of a Broken Dream") and problems with America's capitalist economy ("You Won't Make a Fool out of Me", "Man with No Country" and "Requiem for a Dying Song"). Spin magazine's review pointed to the band's non-Irish influences evident on the album, including Motörhead, Johnny Cash and John Lennon.

Track listing 
 "Requiem for a Dying Song" – 3:30
 "(No More) Paddy's Lament" – 3:24
 "Float" – 4:53
 "You Won't Make a Fool Out of Me" – 2:43
 "The Lightning Storm" – 3:29
 "Punch Drunk Grinning Soul" – 4:20 (the end features a 30-second performance by Tom Corrigan called "Moral Decay")
 "Us of Lesser Gods" – 3:19
 "Between a Man and a Woman" – 3:21
 "From the Back of a Broken Dream" – 3:21
 "Man with No Country" – 3:04
 "The Story So Far" – 4:11

Personnel 
Dave King – vocals, acoustic guitar, electric guitar, bodhran
Bridget Regan – violin, classical guitar, tin whistle, uilleann pipes, vocals
Dennis Casey – electric guitar, acoustic guitar, vocals
Matt Hensley – accordion, concertina, piano, vocals
Nathen Maxwell – bass guitar, vocals
Bob Schmidt – five-string banjo, tenor banjo, mandolin, mandola, vocals
George Schwindt – drums, percussion

Charts

References 

Flogging Molly albums
2008 albums
SideOneDummy Records albums